United Nations Security Council Resolution 92, adopted on May 8, 1951, recalling its previous resolutions demanding a cease-fire in the Arab-Israeli conflict the Council noted with concern that fighting had broken out in and around the demilitarized zone established by the Israel-Syrian General Armistice Agreement of 20 July 1949 and that fighting was continuing despite the cease-fire order of the Acting Chief of Staff of the United Nations Truce Supervision Organization in Palestine.  The Council called upon the parties of persons in the areas concerned to cease fighting and called them to comply with their obligations and commitments to previous resolutions and Agreements.

The resolution passed with ten votes; the Soviet Union abstained.

See also
 List of United Nations Security Council Resolutions 1 to 100 (1946–1953)
 United Nations Security Council Resolution 54
 United Nations Security Council Resolution 73
 United Nations Security Council Resolution 89

References
Text of the Resolution at undocs.org

External links
 

 0092
 0092
Israeli–Palestinian conflict and the United Nations
1951 in Syria
1948 Arab–Israeli War
 0092
May 1951 events
United Nations Security Council resolutions concerning Palestine